Little Sandy may refer to:

Little Sandy, Kentucky, an unincorporated community in Elliott County
Little Sandy, West Virginia, an unincorporated community in Preston County
Little Sandy Correctional Complex, in Elliott County, Kentucky
Little Sandy Desert, in Western Australia
Little Sandy Pond, in Plymouth, Massachusetts
Little Sandy River (disambiguation)